The 2009 World Men's Curling Championship (branded as 2009 Ford World Men's Curling Championship presented by Atlantic Lottery for sponsorship reasons) was held in Moncton, New Brunswick, Canada from April 4–12, 2009, at the Moncton Coliseum. The event, which formally celebrated 50 years of World Men's Curling (1959-2009) plus the 225th anniversary of the host province of New Brunswick, kicked off with a three-hour extravaganza combining the Opening Ceremonies and Opening Banquet, an unprecedented start to the World Men's Curling Championship.

Qualification
Two teams from the Americas region (including Canada as host), two Pacific region teams (via the 2008 Pacific Curling Championships) and eight teams from the European region (via the 2008 European Curling Championships). For the first time ever, a third country from the Americas expressed intent to participate in the qualification process, necessitating a qualifying tournament between the United States and Brazil held between January 30 and February 1, 2009. Canada, as defending champions and hosts do not have to qualify, as they automatically get to participate.

  (Host country and defending champion)
  (Americas) 
  (Pacific champion)
  (Pacific runner-up) 
 Top seven finishers from the 2008 European Curling Championships 
  
  
  
  
  
  
  
  (winner of World Challenge series vs. )

Teams

* Throws third stones

Round-robin standings

Final round-robin standings

Round-robin results
All draw times local (GMT-3 or Atlantic Daylight Time)

Draw 1
April 4, 3:00pm

Draw 2
April 4, 7:30pm

Draw 3
April 5, 8:30am

Draw 4
April 5, 1:00pm

Draw 5
April 5, 7:30pm

Draw 6
April 6, 10:00am

Draw 7
April 6, 3:00pm

Draw 8
April 6, 7:30pm

Draw 9
April 7, 10:00am

Draw 10
April 7, 3:00pm

Draw 11
April 7, 7:30pm

Draw 12
April 8, 10:00am

Draw 13
April 8, 3:00pm

Draw 14
April 8, 7:30pm

Draw 15
April 9, 10:00am

Draw 16
April 9, 3:00pm

Draw 17
April 9, 7:30pm

Tiebreakers
April 10, 3:00pm

Playoffs

1 vs. 2
April 10, 7:30pm

3 vs. 4
April 11, 10:00am

Semifinal
April 11, 4:00pm

Bronze medal game
April 12, 1:00pm

Gold medal game
April 12, 7:30pm

Player percentages
Top five percentages per position during the round robin.

References

External links
Official Website

Curling competitions in Moncton
World Men's Curling Championship
International sports competitions hosted by Canada
World
April 2009 sports events in Canada